Charax in Bithynia ( or Χάρακας της Βιθυνίας) was a Roman and Byzantine port town of ancient Bithynia, in what is now Turkey. It was on the north side of the Sinus Astacenus on the road between the erstwhile Eastern Roman and Byzantine capital Nicomedia and Libyssa. Stephanus of Byzantium calls it a place of great trade.

Its site is located near Hereke, in Asiatic Turkey.

References

Roman towns and cities in Turkey
Populated places in Bithynia
Archaeological sites in the Marmara Region
Former populated places in Turkey
History of Kocaeli Province
Populated places of the Byzantine Empire